The Henschel Hs 127 was a German bomber that was built as two prototypes, but cancelled without entering mass production.

In 1935, the RLM (Reichsluftfahrtministerium - German Ministry of Aviation) published requests for a fast tactical bomber. Junkers, Focke-Wulf, Messerschmitt  and Henschel all submitted designs.

According to RLM specifications, the plane was to be able to maintain a speed of 500 km/h (313 mph) for 30 minutes, take-off to a height of 20 m (65 ft) in not more than 750 m (2,460 ft), and carry one defensive machine gun and 500–800 kg (1,100-1,760 lb) of bombs. The crew was to consist of a pilot, a bombardier/navigator and a gunner.

Focke-Wulf soon withdrew from participation, so three projects were presented: the future Hs 127, the Junkers Ju 88 and the Messerschmitt Bf 162. Prototypes were ordered of all three, with new Daimler-Benz DB 600 engines to be installed on all three types.

The maiden flight of the Hs 127 V1 was at the end of 1937. The plane was smaller and lighter than the Ju 88 and had a very good top speed of 565 km/h (353 mph), but the Ju 88 was chosen because of its bigger bomb load.

In May 1938, the contract for Hs 127 development was cancelled by the RLM and the third prototype was not finished.

The Hs 127 was a low-wing monoplane with monocoque fuselage. Its two-spar wing had an all-metal covering and was equipped with flaps. Its retractable gear had shock-absorbers to facilitate operations from poor airstrips. All three crew members sat in the nose.

Specifications

See also

References

Further reading

 Smith, J.Richard and Kay, Anthony. German Aircraft of the Second World War. London: Putnam & Company Ltd., 1972 (third impression 1978). .
 Wood, Tony and Gunston, Bill. Hitler's Luftwaffe: A pictorial history and technical encyclopedia of Hitler's air power in World War II. London: Salamander Books Ltd., 1977. . 

Abandoned military aircraft projects of Germany
1930s German bomber aircraft
Hs 127
Low-wing aircraft
Aircraft first flown in 1937
Twin piston-engined tractor aircraft